The Masters Series or simply Masters were single-elimination Magic: The Gathering tournaments open to the most accomplished players only. These tournaments awarded cash prizes upon entrance and were held at several Pro Tours each season. The first predecessor to the Masters Series, named Team Challenge, was held at the 2000 Pro Tour New York. In the following seasons Masters were held at four different Pro Tours each season. The last Masters was held at Pro Tour Yokohama. Ben Rubin was the most successful player at the Masters Series, being the only player to win two events.

After the 2002–03 season the cash that would have gone into the Masters Series prizes was instead used for a final payout at the end of the season based on Pro Points. This payout was in turn replaced by the Pro Player's Club two years later.

Masters champions

References 

Magic: The Gathering professional events
Recurring events established in 1999
Recurring events disestablished in 2003